The canton of Laon-1 is an administrative division of the Aisne department, in northern France. It was created at the French canton reorganisation which came into effect in March 2015. Its seat is in Laon.

It consists of the following communes: 
 
Anizy-le-Grand  
Aulnois-sous-Laon
Bassoles-Aulers
Besny-et-Loizy
Bourguignon-sous-Montbavin
Brancourt-en-Laonnois
Bucy-lès-Cerny
Cerny-lès-Bucy
Cessières-Suzy
Chaillevois
Chambry
Clacy-et-Thierret
Crépy
Laniscourt
Laon (partly)
Merlieux-et-Fouquerolles
Molinchart
Mons-en-Laonnois
Montbavin
Pinon
Prémontré
Royaucourt-et-Chailvet
Urcel
Vaucelles-et-Beffecourt
Vauxaillon
Vivaise
Wissignicourt

References

Cantons of Aisne